RRP can stand for:

Business
Recommended retail price
Reverse Repurchase Agreement

Health and medicine
Radical retropubic prostatectomy
Recurrent Respiratory Papillomatosis

Other
Rembrandt Research Project
Regions of Republican Subordination in Tajikistan (Russian: Raiony Respublikanskogo Podchineniya)
Rishi Rich Productions
Renovation, Repair and Painting, a lead-based paint safety regulation in the United States